Prismane or 'Ladenburg benzene' is a polycyclic hydrocarbon with the formula C6H6. It is an isomer of benzene, specifically a valence isomer. Prismane is far less stable than benzene. The carbon (and hydrogen) atoms of the prismane molecule are arranged in the shape of a six-atom triangular prism—this compound is the parent and simplest member of the prismanes class of molecules. Albert Ladenburg proposed this structure for the compound now known as benzene. The compound was not synthesized until 1973.

History
In the mid 19th century, investigators proposed several possible structures for benzene which were consistent with its empirical formula, C6H6, which had been determined by combustion analysis. The first, which was proposed by Kekulé in 1865, later proved to be closest to the true structure of benzene. This structure inspired several others to draw structures that were consistent with benzene's empirical formula; for example, Ladenburg proposed prismane, Dewar proposed Dewar benzene, and Koerner and Claus proposed Claus' benzene. Some of these structures would be synthesized in the following years. Prismane, like the other proposed structures for benzene, is still often cited in the literature, because it is part of the historical struggle toward understanding the mesomeric structures and resonance of benzene. Some computational chemists still research the differences between the possible isomers of C6H6.

Properties
Prismane is a colourless liquid at room temperature.  The deviation of the carbon-carbon bond angle from 109° to 60° in a triangle leads to a high ring strain, reminiscent of that of cyclopropane but greater. The compound is explosive, which is unusual for a hydrocarbon. Due to this ring strain, the bonds have a low bond energy and break at a low activation energy, which makes synthesis of the molecule difficult; Woodward and Hoffmann noted that prismane's thermal rearrangement to benzene is symmetry-forbidden, comparing it to "an angry tiger unable to break out of a paper cage."  On account of its strain energy and the aromatic stabilization of benzene, the molecule is estimated to be 90 kcal/mole less stable than benzene, but the activation of this highly exothermic transformation is a surprisingly high 33 kcal/mol, making it persistent at room temperature.

The substituted derivative hexamethylprismane (in which all six hydrogens are substituted by methyl groups) has a higher stability, and was synthesized by rearrangement reactions in 1966.

Synthesis

The synthesis starts from benzvalene (1) and 4-phenyltriazolidone (2), which is a strong dienophile. The reaction is a stepwise Diels-Alder like reaction, forming a carbocation as intermediate. The adduct (3) is then hydrolyzed under basic conditions and afterwards transformed into a copper(II) chloride derivative with acidic copper(II) chloride. Neutralized with a strong base, the azo compound (5) could be crystallized with 65% yield. The last step is a photolysis of the azo compound. This photolysis leads to a biradical which forms prismane (6) and nitrogen with a yield of less than 10%.  The compound was isolated by preparative gas chromatography.

See also
 Prismane C8, a C8 allotrope of carbon
Cubane

References

External links
 Molecules with silly or unusual Names

Hydrocarbons
Molecular geometry
Tetracyclic compounds
Cyclobutanes
Cyclopropanes
Explosive chemicals
Substances discovered in the 1970s